Bremer Beiträge was the designation for the weekly magazine Neue Beyträge zum Vergnügen des Verstandes und Witzes ("New contributions to the pleasure of the mind and wit"). It was published from 1744 to 1759 during the Age of Enlightenment.

History 
The magazine was founded in Bremen in 1744 by the writer Karl Christian Gärtner. It was published by Nathanael Saurmann and was considered a mouthpiece of the Saxon school of poetry. Together with Gärtner, Johann Andreas Cramer, Johann Arnold Ebert, Gottlieb Wilhelm Rabener, Johann Adolf Schlegel, and Konrad Arnold Schmid worked since the founding of the magazine.

Later contributors included Christian Fürchtegott Gellert, Nikolaus Dietrich Giseke, Friedrich Gottlieb Klopstock, Christlob Mylius, and Justus Friedrich Wilhelm Zachariae. It was here that Klopstock published the first cantos of his epic poem Der Messias.

See also 
 Johann Christoph Gottsched

Edition 
 Neue Beyträge zum Vergnügen des Verstandes und Witzes. Hildesheim: Olms, 1978. (Microfiche edition, reprint of Bremen, 1744−1759.

Notes

References 
 Christel Matthias Schröder. Die „Bremer Beiträge“: Vorgeschichte und Geschichte einer deutschen Zeitschrift des 18. Jahrhunderts. Bremen: Schünemann Verlag, 1956.
 Fritz Meyen. Bremer Beiträge am Collegium Carolinum in Braunschweig: K. Chr. Gärtner, J. A. Ebert, F. W. Zachariä, K. A. Schmid. Braunschweig: Waisenhaus-Buchdruckerei und Verlag, 1962. (Braunschweiger Werkstücke 26)
''This article is based on a translation of the corresponding article on the German Wikipedia.

1744 establishments in the Holy Roman Empire
1759 disestablishments in the Holy Roman Empire
Defunct literary magazines published in Germany
German-language magazines
History of Bremen (city)
Magazines established in 1744
Magazines disestablished in 1759
Mass media in Bremen (city)